Rogelio "Roger" P. Olivares is a Filipino author.

A graduate of the Ateneo de Manila University (AB-economics) and the University of Illinois (Fulbright scholar, MS in communications), he has lived in New York City, San Francisco, Guam, Spain, and in the island of Crete in Greece. He now lives in Atlanta, Georgia, and writes about his native country, the Philippines.

He is best known for his novel Noli Me Tangere 2, and for writing the first travel guidebook in the Philippines, Roger's Do-It-Yourself Tours.

Books

 Teresa of Avila
 How Granada Was Won
 Noli Me Tangere 2
 Odyssey in Crete
 Siege of Alcazar
 Con Todo Mi Corazon

External links
 Official Noli Me Tangere 2 Page

Year of birth missing (living people)
Filipino writers
Living people
Ateneo de Manila University alumni
University of Illinois alumni